Baekseok Arts University (BAU) is a private Christian art college focused on Music and Design located in Seoul, South Korea, founded in 1983. BAU has 7,000 students in 9 departments.

Areas of study
Areas of study include:
 Music: Classical, Traditional Performing, Contemporary Music, Musical Theatre, Performance Project, Playwriting, Acting
 Design: Visual Communication, Interior, Media, Advertising
 Painting, Fine Art
 Food Industry
 Tourism
 Airline Service
 Languages:  English, Japanese, Chinese
 Education: Early Childhood Education, Teacher Education
 Social Welfare
 Business Administration

Notable alumni
Minzy – singer and dancer, former member of 2NE1
Ken – singer and actor, member of VIXX
 Ravi – rapper and singer-songwriter, member of VIXX 
 Leo – singer-songwriter, member of VIXX
 Jaehyuk – singer and dancer, member of Treasure
 Hwang Yunseong – singer and dancer,  member of Drippin
 Jung Yeonjoo - singer and dancer, member of lilli lilli and former member of P.O.P

References

External links
 Official home-page in Korean and English

Universities and colleges in Seoul
Educational institutions established in 1983
1983 establishments in South Korea
Seocho District